Mandelbach is a river of Saarland, Germany. It flows into the Blies in Habkirchen. The municipality 
Mandelbachtal takes its name from this river.

See also
List of rivers of Saarland

Rivers of Saarland
Rivers of Germany